The Maintenance Management Professional designation (MMP) is a registered professional designation in Canada issued on the authority of the President of PEMAC Asset Management Association of Canada (PEMAC) to individuals who successfully complete a series of eight courses and who are members in good standing of PEMAC. The series of courses is designed to provide participants with an understanding of the various concepts necessary to be an effective maintenance and physical asset management professional. The courses are offered through several teaching institutions in Canada.

Required courses 
The program is broken down into a series of 8 courses, or modules, as follows:

Participating teaching institutions
 Bow Valley College
 British Columbia Institute of Technology
 Cambrian College
 College of New Caledonia
 College of the North Atlantic
 Conestoga College
 Fanshawe College
 Humber College
 Keyano College
 Mohawk College
 Northern College
 Northern Lakes College
 St. Clair College
 Université du Québec

See also 
Enterprise asset management

References 

Maintenance
Education in Canada
Business occupations
Management education